The 2017 CONMEBOL qualifiers for the FIFA Beach Soccer World Cup, (natively in Spanish: Eliminatorias CONMEBOL al Mundial de la FIFA de Fútbol Playa Asunción 2017) was the seventh edition of the Beach Soccer World Cup qualification championship contested by the men's national teams of South America to determine the best beach soccer nation on the continent, organised by CONMEBOL. The tournament acted as a qualifying event to the 2017 FIFA Beach Soccer World Cup, with the top three finishing nations progressing to the finals in the Bahamas.

The competition took place from 5 to 12 February 2017 in Lambaré, Gran Asunción, Paraguay, with ten nations taking part. Brazil were the defending champions.

Participating teams and draw
The following ten teams entered the tournament.

 (hosts)

The draw of the tournament was held on 20 January 2017, 12:00 UTC−3, at the CONMEBOL headquarters in Luque, Paraguay. The ten teams were drawn into two groups of five teams. The teams were seeded according to their results in the 2015 CONMEBOL Beach Soccer Championship.

Group stage
Each team earns three points for a win in regulation time, two points for a win in extra time, one point for a win in a penalty shoot-out, and no points for a defeat. The top two teams from each group advance to the semi-finals, while the bottom three teams from each group enter the placement stage for 5th to 10th place.

All times are local, PYST (UTC−3).

Group A

Group B

Placement stage (5th–10th place)

Bracket (5th–10th place)

9th place match

5th place semi-finals

7th place match

5th place match

Knockout stage

Bracket (1st–4th place)

Semi-finals
Winners qualify for 2017 FIFA Beach Soccer World Cup.

3rd place match
Winner qualifies for 2017 FIFA Beach Soccer World Cup.

Final

Awards

Winners

Individual awards
The following awards were given at the conclusion of the tournament.

Final ranking

Qualified teams for FIFA Beach Soccer World Cup
The following three teams from CONMEBOL qualified for the 2017 FIFA Beach Soccer World Cup.

1 Bold indicates champion for that year. Italic indicates host for that year.

References

External links
Eliminatorias Mundial futbol de playa, CONMEBOL.com
FIFA Beach Soccer World Cup 2017 - CONMEBOL Qualifier Asuncion at Beachsoccer.com

Qualification CONMEBOL
2017
2017 in beach soccer
2017 in South American football